The 1957 Australian Championships was a tennis tournament that took place on outdoor Grass courts at the Kooyong Lawn Tennis Club, Melbourne, Australia from 17 January to 27 January. It was the 45th edition of the Australian Championships (now known as the Australian Open), the 13th held in Melbourne, and the first Grand Slam tournament of the year. The singles titles were taken by Ashley Cooper and Shirley Fry.

Champions

Men's singles

 Ashley Cooper defeated  Neale Fraser  6–3, 9–11, 6–4, 6–2

Women's singles

 Shirley Fry defeated  Althea Gibson  6–3, 6–4

Men's doubles
 Neale Fraser /  Lew Hoad defeated  Mal Anderson /  Ashley Cooper 6–3, 8–6, 6–4

Women's doubles
 Shirley Fry /  Althea Gibson defeated  Mary Bevis Hawton /  Fay Muller 6–2, 6–1

Mixed doubles
 Fay Muller  /  Mal Anderson defeated  Jill Langley /   Billy Knight 7–5, 3–6, 6–1

References

External links
 Australian Open official website

1957
1957 in Australian tennis
January 1957 sports events in Australia